Vatican Radio is the official broadcasting service of Vatican City.

Established in 1931 by Guglielmo Marconi, today its programs are offered in 47 languages, and are sent out on short wave, DRM, medium wave, FM, satellite and the Internet. Since its inception, Vatican Radio has been maintained by the Jesuit Order. Vatican Radio preserved its independence during the rise of Fascist Italy and Nazi Germany.

Today, programming is produced by over 200 journalists located in 61 countries. Vatican Radio produces more than 42,000 hours of simultaneous broadcasting covering international news, religious celebrations, in-depth programs, and music. The current general director is Father Federico Lombardi, S.J.

On 27 June 2015, Pope Francis, in a motu proprio apostolic letter, established the Secretariat for Communications in the Roman Curia, which absorbed Vatican Radio effective 1 January 2017, ending the organization's 85 years of independent operation.

History

1930s

Vatican Radio began broadcasting with the callsign HVJ on two shortwave frequencies using 10 kilowatts (kW) of power on 12 February 1931, with the pontificial message "Omni creaturae" of Pope Pius XI. Also in attendance was Guglielmo Marconi and Cardinal Eugenio Pacelli, who would become Pope Pius XII. Its first director was physicist Giuseppe Gianfranceschi, who was also the president of the Accademia dei Nuovi Lincei.

In 1933, a permanent microwave link was established between the Vatican Palace and the summer residence of the papacy, Castel Gandolfo.

In 1936, the International Telecommunication Union (ITU) recognized Vatican Radio as a "special case" and authorized its broadcasting without any geographical limits. On 25 December 1937 a Telefunken 25 kW transmitter and two directional antennas were added. Vatican Radio broadcast over 10 frequencies.

World War II

Following a December 1939 report from Cardinal August Hlond of Poznań detailing the oppression of the Catholic Church in Poland, Pope Pius XII decided, among other measures, to use Vatican Radio to provide "information regarding the condition of the church in Poland." The German broadcast on 21 January 1940 compared German activities to "what the Communists imposed on Spain in 1936"; the English service noted the attacks on the Church were not limited to the Soviets.

During World War II, Vatican Radio's news broadcasts were (like all foreign broadcasts) banned in Germany. During the war, the radio service operated in four languages.

While some critics have said Pope Pius XII was too quiet regarding the Holocaust, Jacques Adler examined the transcripts of wartime broadcasts over the Vatican Radio. Adler argues that it exposed Nazi persecution of the Church and opposed collaboration with Nazism. It appealed to Catholics to remain true to their faith's injunctions: to defend the sanctity of life and the unity of humankind. In so doing the Pope pursued a policy of spiritual resistance to Nazi ideology and racism.

1940s and 1950s
In 1948, services expanded to 18 languages.

Due to space constraints, the Holy See acquired a 400-hectare area located 18 kilometres north of Rome at Santa Maria di Galeria. The Italian Republic granted the site extraterritorial status in 1952.

In 1957, a new broadcasting center was placed in operation, with a Philips 100 kW shortwave transmitter, two 10 kW shortwave transmitters, and one 120 kW mediumwave transmitter, with 21 directional and one omnidirectional antenna. The next phase involved two 100 kW transmitters aimed at Africa and Oceania, a 250 kW mediumwave transmitter for Europe, and a 500 kW transmitter for the Far East and Latin America.

Radio Vaticana was one of 23 founding broadcasting organisations of the European Broadcasting Union in 1950.

2000s
In the 21st century, Vatican Radio has experimented with digital transmission technologies (DRM, T-DAB, T-DMB) and has used electronic newsletters, podcasts, and other new technologies to distribute its programming. Vatican Radio and CTV began their own YouTube channel in 2010, operating in four languages, and operates six Twitter accounts.

In May 2009 it was announced that Vatican Radio would begin broadcasting commercial advertisements for the first time in July. The decision was made to meet the radio's rising costs, namely 21.4m euros a year. All advertisements would have to meet "high moral standards". Vatican Radio stopped transmitting short- and medium-wave broadcasts to North America, South America, and Europe on Sunday 1 July 2012. The Vatican Press Office closed Vatican Information Service in August 2012.

In 2014 Michael Gannon, from Ireland, became the first person with Down Syndrome to work at any Vatican office, which he did as an intern at Vatican Radio.

As of 2016, Vatican Radio had a staff of 355 people who produce more than 66 hours of daily programming in 45 languages on air, and 38 languages on the website. Programs are broadcast via short wave,  FM and satellite.

Vatican Radio has been losing between €20 and €30 million annually. With its absorption into the Curia's Secretariat for Communications on 1 January 2017 Vatican Radio director Msgr. Dario Viganò has indicated that he plans to pare down short-wave radio operations and institute cost control measures in the service's other broadcast operations.

On 24 March 2017, Vatican Radio made its final English-language shortwave transmission to Asia after 59 years of service. Vatican Radio's English Service for Asia has then continued online.

Television and satellite
During the 1930s, the station made experimental television broadcasts. Apart from a brief experimental revival in the 1950s, it was not until the 1990s that a regular 'satellite' television service began. The programs of TV2000 include programming from Vatican Television Center.

Vatican Channel HD is available in English and Italian on the satellite through Eutelsat Hot Bird 13°est (11334 MHz, pol.H, Sr 27500,3/4) as well as on terrestrial TV in the Rome metropolitan area, and Vatican Media Europe multilanguage on Hot Bird 13B (12475 MHz, pol.H, Sr 29900, 3/4).

Vatican Radio Europe is available via satellite through Eutelsat Hot Bird 13°est (12476 MHz, pol.H, Sr 29900, 3/4) and Radio Vaticana 5, in italian Eutelsat 9B (12466 MHz, pol.V, Sr 41950, 3/4).

Transmitters

The signals are transmitted from a large shortwave and medium-wave transmission facility for Radio Vatican. The Santa Maria di Galeria Transmitter was established in 1957 and it is an extraterritorial area in Italy belonging to the Holy See. Vatican Radio's interval signal, Christus Vincit, is a well-known sound on shortwave radio.

One aerial for the medium wave frequency 1530 kHz which consists of four  grounded freestanding towers arranged in a square, which carry wires for a medium wave aerial on horizontal crossbars. The direction of this aerial can be changed.

From May 2014 to December 2016 the antennas of Santa Maria di Galeria were progressively decommissioned, which radiated the average wave signal on 1530 kHz with programs destined for Italy, Europe and the Mediterranean area.

Radiation controversy

The Santa Maria di Galeria transmitter site is the subject of a dispute between the station and some local residents who claim the non-ionising radiation from the site has affected their health.

See also

 Index of Vatican City-related articles
 International religious radio broadcasters
 L'Osservatore Romano
 Vatican Radio website DDoS attack from Anonymous on March 12, 2012
 The World Family of Radio Maria
 List of Jesuit sites

Notes

References
 Blet, Pierre. Pius XII and the Second World War: According to the Archives of the Vatican. Translated by Lawrence J. Johnson. 1999, Paulist Press. 
 Levilliain, Philippe. The Papacy: An Encyclopedia. Translated by John O'Malley. Routledge, 2002. 
 Matelski, Marilyn J. Vatican Radio: Propagation by the Airwaves. 1995, Praeger

External links

 Founding of Vatican Radio
  
 Diagram of the Radio Vatican Towers
 Diagram of the Radio Vatican Towers
 Diagram of the Radio Vatican Towers
 Diagram of the Radio Vatican Towers
 The Vatican: spirit and art of Christian Rome, a book from The Metropolitan Museum of Art Libraries (fully available online as PDF), which contains material on Vatican Radio (p. 43-46)

Dicastery for Communication
 
Catholic radio stations
European Broadcasting Union members
International broadcasters
Radio during World War II
Radio stations established in 1931
Mass media in Vatican City
1931 establishments in Vatican City